Yevgeny Marchenko may refer to:

 Yevgeny Marchenko (gymnast) (born 1964), Latvian-American gymnast
 Yevgeny Marchenko (politician) (born 1972), Russian politician